Olivia M. Lamasan is a Filipina television and film director, writer, producer, and creative consultant, known for her works such as Sana Maulit Muli and Madrasta which were both successful.

Lamasan, the former head of ABS-CBN's creative department, also served as the managing director of ABS-CBN Film Productions, Inc. until 2022. The master director remains as consultant of the network's film/television outfit. Inang, as fondly called by her colleagues in the industry, is also a resident television and film director of the network.

Career 
Lamasan began her career in 1986 as a Production Assistant in Nine Deaths of the Ninja. Lamasan also directed the hit film of 1996, Madrasta which received multiple awards from the Philippines.

In 2002, Lamasan directed Got 2 Believe starring Claudine Barretto and Rico Yan and also directing Milan in 2004 starring Barretto and Piolo Pascual.

In 2009, Lamasan directed In My Life starring the Philippines' "Star for All Seasons" Vilma Santos, Luis Manzano and John Lloyd Cruz. The film was successful having a gross revenue of PHP137.4 Million.

In 2011, she also directed In the Name of Love which was  one of the highest-grossing Filipino film of all time grossing for over PHP117 Million The film starred Aga Muhlach, Jake Cuenca and Angel Locsin. The film was a nominee for the "Best Movie of the Year" Award in the 28th Star Awards for Movies. Nevertheless, Locsin and Muhlach won the Best Actress and Actor category. Lamasan also won as Best Director for the film in the PASADO Awards.

In 2012, Lasaman directed The Mistress which was a worldwide success for earning PHP300 Million.

In 2013, Lamasan was one of the judges in the biggest songwriting competition in the Philippines, Himig Handog.

In February 2014, Lamasan directed the film Starting Over Again which was an instant box-office success earning 410 million pesos, and was included in the List of highest-grossing films in the Philippines of all time.

In September 2016, Lamasan directed the film Barcelona: A Love Untold which was an instant box-office success earning 300 million pesos worldwide.

Filmography

Television

Film

Awards

See also 
Star Cinema

References

External links 

Living people
ABS-CBN people
Filipino film directors
Filipino women film directors
Year of birth missing (living people)